Workhouse Hill is a hamlet in the Colchester district, in the English county of Essex.

References 

Sources

 Essex A-Z 2010. p. 159.

Hamlets in Essex
Borough of Colchester